Tony Forsyth (born Liverpool, Lancashire) is a former English theatre and film actor of the 1980s-90s, noted for his troubled teen portrayals and scouse accent.

Forsyth is best known for his role playing rent-boy "Michael" in the 1988 British film The Fruit Machine, a/k/a Wonderland (USA). He first appeared on television in the BBC's John Lennon: A Journey in the Life and Channel 4's Brookside before being cast in The Fruit Machine, writer Frank Clarke's follow-up to Letter to Brezhnev.

Other film roles include Hard Days Hard Nights as Alan in a story loosely based on the Beatles trip to Hamburg before they hit the big time, The Tall Guy as Berkoff Actor and Derek Jarman's Edward II in which he played Captive Policeman. Other TV appearances include a guest spot in ITV's drama series Heartbeat as Ian Clayton and playing opposite Selina Cadell in Screenplay broadcast on BBC 2 in 1992.

Several other film roles were completed, along with a stage career.

Career
Theatre:
 Sheffield Crucible Theatre
 Bolton Octagon Theatre
 
Billy Casper in Kes, Chiron in Titus Andronicus, Dave in Pocket Dream, The Moon in Blood Wedding, Malcolm in Macbeth, Young Scrooge/Ghost of Christmas Future in A Christmas Carol.

 Work in London:
 
John in Shelter, Neil in Boystalk (Royal National Studio).
 Tours:
 
Claudio in Much Ado About Nothing (Oxford Stage Company Tour to Malaysia and Japan).
 Royal Shakespeare Company:
 
Tsarina in A Patriot For Me.
 
In 1998,played Red Rutter, "the Dribbler", of Todchester Rovers in "Shooting Stars" written by Basil Thomas at the Chester Gateway.
 
In 2000, national tour of "Naked Flame".
 
In 2002, played Jambo in "Naked Flame 2 - Fire Down Under!" in national tour.
 
Television:
 Journey in the Life of John Lennon
 Heartbeat
 Life and Works
 High Rise Low Life
 Brookside

Recent activity
In recent years, TV appearances have been added to Forsyth's accomplishments and in 1999 spent time directing at the Greenwich Theatre in London. More recently, Forsyth has been working as a casting director.

Select filmography

See the complete Tony Forsyth  filmography at IMDB

References
 Peter Gill, Playwright and Theatre Director - A Patriot for Me

http://www.arts-archive.co.uk/index.php?pg=12&action=performance&pid=L813539716&arch=Y "Cast list and info for Naked Flame 2"

http://findarticles.com/p/articles/mi_qn4158/is_/ai_n14155152 "Review of Shooting Stars"

http://www.arts-archive.co.uk/index.php?pg=12&action=performance&pid=L1580945438&arch=Y  "Cast list and info for Naked Flame"

External links

Year of birth missing (living people)
Living people
English male film actors
English male stage actors
Male actors from Liverpool